Middle Irish, sometimes called Middle Gaelic, is the Goidelic language which was spoken in Ireland, most of Scotland and the Isle of Man from  AD; it is therefore a contemporary of late Old English and early Middle English. The modern Goidelic languages—Irish, Scottish Gaelic and Manx—are all descendants of Middle Irish.

Grammar

Middle Irish is a fusional, VSO, nominative-accusative language.

Nouns decline for two genders: masculine, feminine, though traces of neuter declension persist; three numbers: singular, dual, plural; and five cases: nominative, accusative, genitive, prepositional, vocative. Adjectives agree with nouns in gender, number, and case.

Verbs conjugate for three tenses: past, present, future; four moods: indicative, subjunctive, conditional, imperative; independent and dependent forms. Verbs conjugate for three persons and an impersonal, agentless form (agent). There are a number of preverbal particles marking the negative, interrogative, subjunctive, relative clauses, etc.

Prepositions inflect for person and number. Different prepositions govern different cases, depending on intended semantics.

Example

The following is a poem in Middle Irish about Eógan Bél, King of Connacht.

References

Further reading

See also

Dictionary of the Irish Language

Languages attested from the 10th century
History of the Irish language
Irish, 2
Scottish Gaelic language
Culture of medieval Scotland
Medieval Ireland
Manx language